The 1993 Peters NSW Open was the 1993 edition of the annually-held NSW Open tennis tournament.  It was held from 11 to 18 January, in Sydney, Australia, as part of the 1993 ATP Tour and the 1993 WTA Tour.

Pete Sampras won his first of two Sydney titles, while Jennifer Capriati won the women's singles.

Finals

Men's singles

 Pete Sampras defeated  Thomas Muster, 7–6(9–7), 6–1

Women's singles

 Jennifer Capriati defeated  Anke Huber, 6–1, 6–4

Men's doubles
 Sandon Stolle /  Jason Stoltenberg defeated  Luke Jensen /  Murphy Jensen, 6–3, 6–4

Women's doubles
 Pam Shriver /  Elizabeth Smylie defeated  Lori McNeil /  Rennae Stubbs, 6–2, 6–2

References

External links
 Official website
 ITF tournament edition details (men)
 ITF tournament edition details (women)

 
Peters NSW Open, 1993